Pararhodacarus is a genus of mites in the family Rhodacaridae.

Species
 Pararhodacarus intermedius L. C. Jordaan, G. C. Loots & P. D. Theron, 1988

References

Rhodacaridae